Salvaterra is a Brazilian municipality located in the state of Pará. Its population as of 2020 is estimated to be 24,075 people. The area of the municipality is 1,043.504 km². The city is located in the mesoregion Marajó and the microregion of Arari.

Conservation

The municipality is contained in the  Marajó Archipelago Environmental Protection Area, a sustainable use conservation unit established in 1989 to protect the environment of the delta region.
The municipality operates the Mata do Bacurizal e do Lago Caraparu Ecological Reserve, a forest area with a lake just south of the town of Salvaterra.

References

Sources

Municipalities in Pará